The women's tournament of the Volleyball competition at the 2019 Pacific Games was held from July 13–19, 2019 at the National University of Samoa Gymnasium in Apia, Samoa. New Caledonia won the gold medal by defeating Tahiti in the final.

Participating teams
Seven women's teams participated in the tournament:

Pool A

Pool B

Preliminary round

Pool A

Pool B

Second round

Pool C

5th–7th playoffs

Pool D

Final round

Bronze medal match

Gold medal match

See also
 Volleyball at the 2019 Pacific Games – Men's tournament

References

Pacific Games Women
Volleyball at the 2019 Pacific Games